Andy Marefos (July 16, 1917 – February 18, 1996) was an American football fullback and halfback. He played for the New York Giants from 1941 to 1942 and for the Los Angeles Dons in 1946.

He died on February 18, 1996, in Marysville, California at age 78.

References

1917 births
1996 deaths
American football fullbacks
American football halfbacks
Saint Mary's Gaels football players
New York Giants players
Los Angeles Dons players
Edmonton Elks players